Veda Hlubinka-Cook (born Robert Cook, on December 26, 1964) is an American programmer and co-founder of Metaweb. The company was acquired by Google in 2010. She was a video game programmer at Broderbund in the 1980s. She  designed and wrote the games Gumball and D/Generation;  was the model for one of the characters in Jordan Mechner's game Prince of Persia; and was technical director for The Last Express. She came out as transgender in 2017.

References

External links

 
 "Digital cartoon and animation process"

Video game programmers
Women video game programmers
Living people
American video game designers
Yale University alumni
1964 births
LGBT studies articles needing attention